The small forest lizard (Calotes paulus) is a species of agamid lizard found in India (eastern Himalaya, Khasi Hills, Sikkim, and China (Tibet).

References

 Smith, M.A. 1935 Reptiles and Amphibia, Vol. II. in: The fauna of British India, including Ceylon and Burma. Taylor and Francis, London, 440 pp.

Calotes
Reptiles described in 1935
Taxa named by Malcolm Arthur Smith